How to Make It in America is an American comedy-drama television series that ran on HBO from February 14, 2010, to November 20, 2011. The series follows the lives of Ben Epstein (Bryan Greenberg) and his friend Cam Calderon (Victor Rasuk) as they try to succeed in New York City's fashion scene. The show's second season premiered on October 2, 2011.

On December 20, 2011, HBO announced the cancellation of the show citing failure to generate a large audience and buzz. Executive producer Mark Wahlberg expressed hope in an interview for GQ magazine in January 2012 that the show would return on another network.

Synopsis
How to Make it in America followed two enterprising twenty year olds hustling their way through New York City's talent show, determined to achieve their vision of the American dream. Trying to make a name for themselves in New York's competitive fashion scene, Ben Epstein (Greenberg) and his friend and business partner Cam Calderon (Rasuk) use their street knowledge and connections to bring their ambitions to fruition. With the help of Cam's cousin Rene (Guzman), who is trying to market his own high-energy drink, and their well-connected friend Domingo ("Kid Cudi"), the entrepreneurs set out to make it big, encountering obstacles along the way that will require all their ingenuity to overcome.

Cast and characters

Main Cast 

 Bryan Greenberg as Ben Epstein
 Victor Rasuk as Cam Calderon
 Lake Bell as Rachel Chapman
 Eddie Kaye Thomas as David "Kappo" Kaplan
 Scott 'Kid Cudi' Mescudi as Domingo Brown
 Luis Guzmán as Rene Calderon
 Margarita Levieva as Julie
 James Ransone as Tim
 Martha Plimpton as Edie Weitz
 Shannyn Sossamon as Gingy Wu (Season 1)
 Gina Gershon as Nancy Frankenburg (Season 2)
 Nicole LaLiberte as Lulu (Season 2)
 Julie Claire as Robin (Season 2)
 Joe Pantoliano as Felix De Florio (Season 2)
 Eriq La Salle as Everton Thompson (Season 2)
 Andrea Navedo as Debbie Dominguez (Season 2)

Recurring cast
 Joy Suprano as Christen (Season 2)

Production
Ian Edelman wrote the pilot, which the Entourage crew of Mark Wahlberg, Stephen Levinson, Rob Weiss and Julian Farino executive produced. Edelman and Jada Miranda were also executive producers. "This show is a fun ride through the downtown scene, examining the cross section of people and how they relate to the relevant subcultures in NYC," Weiss, who was executive producing the pilot, told the Hollywood Reporter.

HBO made a free early online-only premiere available on various video sites including iTunes and YouTube. Season 2 premiered on HBO on October 2, 2011.

Title sequence
The opening title sequence was created by Isaac Lobe and directing duo Josh & Xander and produced by @radical.media. The theme song, "I Need a Dollar", was performed by Aloe Blacc of Stones Throw Records. Shot in New York City, the sequence comprises a video and photography montage, bringing together the show's underlying themes of "grit, hunger, ambition, the multicultural whirl of New York and the culture-transcending pursuit of the almighty dollar".

Episodes

Season 1 (2010)

Season 2 (2011)

Reception
The first season received mixed reviews. On Metacritic it has a score of 60% based on reviews from 26 critics. 
David Hinkley of the New York Daily News gave the show a positive review, giving the show 4/5 stars, and calling it a "winner". Brian Lowry of Variety was doubtful of the series, stating "barring a dramatic leap in quality" it probably wouldn't last on pay cable. Mark Perigard of the Boston Herald wrote critically, saying "this sad sack of a show plays like an East Coast, economically challenged version of his HBO hit Entourage." Randee Dawn of The Hollywood Reporter said the show "isn't as textured and riveting as it thinks it is". Other reviews favored the show in comparison to Entourage.

The second season did not get much positive reception. On Metacritic only two reviews are listed but both reviews are positive. Maureen Ryan of Huffington Post wrote the show has "a little more discipline and focus than they did in season 1." Phillip Maciak of Slant Magazine also added that the show is "anchored by gorgeous production design and the pop naturalism of its performances, How to Make It in America dramatizes this particular cultural moment with uncommon style and a little grace as well."

References

External links
 
 

HBO original programming
2010 American television series debuts
2010s American comedy-drama television series
2011 American television series endings
Television series by Home Box Office
Television shows set in New York City
Television shows filmed in New York (state)
English-language television shows